The Arado Ar 197 was a German World War II-era biplane, designed for naval operations for the never-completed German aircraft carrier . Only a few prototypes were built; the project was abandoned in favour of the Messerschmitt Bf 109T and Me 155.

Design and development
The Ar 197 had its origin in the requirement for a fighter capable of operating from the planned (but never completed) German aircraft carriers Graf Zeppelin and Peter Strasser. The Ar 68H had been the first Arado aircraft to have a fully enclosed cockpit, and was selected as a base design for the Arado Ar 197.

The first prototype of the Ar 197, the V1, was based on the Ar 68H and featured a fully enclosed cockpit, Daimler-Benz DB 600A inline engine, and three-blade propeller, but was not fitted for naval operations. The second prototype, the Ar 197 V2, was similar to the V1, but was powered by a BMW 132Dc radial engine, and was fitted with naval equipment, including an arrester hook and catapult spools. Both the Ar 197 V1 and V2 flew in the spring of 1937. In the summer of 1937 a third prototype, the V3, was built. It was powered by a more powerful BMW radial engine and was the first prototype fitted with weapons, being armed with two 7.92 mm (.312 in) machine guns and one 20 mm cannon. The V3 was also fitted with racks under the fuselage which could carry four 50 kg (110 lb) bombs, an auxiliary fuel tank, or a smoke-laying canister.

Operational history
The Ar 197 V3 was selected to participate in evaluation, but was not chosen for production. By the time the Graf Zeppelin was to have been completed, biplanes such as the Ar 197 would have been hopelessly outclassed as fighters. In 1939, the Bf 109T, the naval version of the Messerschmitt Bf 109 fighter plane, was selected as the successor to the Arado Ar 197, and in 1941, the Me 155 was selected as the successor to the Bf 109T.

Operators

 Luftwaffe

Specifications (Arado Ar 197 V3)

See also

References

 Kay, Anthony L. and Smith, J. Richard. German Aircraft of the Second World War. Annapolis, MD: Naval Institute Press, 2002. .

Biplanes
Single-engined tractor aircraft
1930s German fighter aircraft
Carrier-based aircraft
Ar 197